Jāzeps Vītols (26 July 1863 – 24 April 1948) was a Latvian composer, pedagogue and music critic. He is considered one of the fathers of Latvian classical music.

Biography

Vītols, born in Valmiera the son of a schoolteacher, began his studies in composition in 1880 at the Saint Petersburg Conservatory with Nikolai Rimsky-Korsakov. After graduating in 1886, he remained at the Conservatory to teach composition and reached the rank of Professor in 1901. His pupils there included Nikolai Myaskovsky and Sergei Prokofiev. Vītols was a close friend of fellow professors Alexander Glazunov and Anatoly Lyadov; he would regularly participate at Mitrofan Belyayev's "Weekly Fridays"—regular meetings of prominent Russian composers at Belyayev's home. At the time, Belyayev was Vītols' primary publisher. Besides academia, Vītols also spent time as a music critic for the St Petersburger Zeitung from 1897 to 1914.

In 1918, Vītols returned from Russia to his newly independent Latvia to conduct the Latvian National Opera. The following year, he established the first Latvian Conservatory of Music, which was later renamed the Jāzeps Vītols Latvian Academy of Music in his honor, and he ran the composition classes there between 1919 and 1944. His most prominent students during his tenure were Jānis Ivanovs, Ādolfs Skulte and Tālivaldis Ķeniņš. He also helped co-found the Latvian Composers' Society in 1923. In 1944, he moved to Lübeck in Germany and lived there until his death in 1948. His remains were returned to Riga in 1993.

Vītols was active not only as a composer, pedagogue, and conductor, but was also a pianist and prolific music critic. He was a member of Latvian student fraternity Fraternitas Lataviensis.

His choral music, especially Gaismas pils (The Castle of Light) is very popular with Latvian choirs, and is often included in the repertoire of the Latvian Song and Dance Festival. Vītols vocal and choral works are published by Musica Baltica Ltd in Riga. He died in Lübeck.

Style
Taking his cue from his Russian colleagues, Vītols became the leading exponent of national romanticism in Latvia. He is considered to be the father of a distinctively Latvian classical music, being the first Latvian composer to achieve international stature. His work reveals the undeniable influence of his teacher Rimsky-Korsakov, not least in the brilliance of its orchestration, an assessment which was shared by Vītols' friend and fellow composer Alexander Glazunov. During his time in Russia, Vītols became deeply interested in Latvian folklore and conducted the Latvian Choir in Saint Petersburg. His melodies clearly draw upon his heritage, and often directly feature Latvian folk tunes. In striving to forge a musical style for Latvia, Vītols emulated the processes of the Russian national school. His large-scale works, which are mostly cast in sonata form, are often characterized by impressive dramatic development. Overall, in comparison with many other 20th-century composers, he tended to be rather conservative but nonetheless possessed a masterly composition technique.

Works
{| class="wikitable sortable" style="font-size: 82%; width:100%; text-align: center;"
|-
! Opus      
! Orchestral 
! Chamber 
! Vocal 
! Piano
! Year      
|-
| 1 
| style="background-color:#E5E4E2;" | 
| style="background-color:#E5E4E2;" rowspan="2" |  
| style="background-color:#E5E4E2;" rowspan="3" |  
| Piano Sonata in B-flat minor
| 1886
|-
| 21
| Dramatic Overture
| style="background-color:#E5E4E2;" rowspan="18" |  
| 1895
|-
| 27 
| style="background-color:#E5E4E2;" rowspan="5" | 
| String Quartet in G major
| 1899
|-
| 35
| style="background-color:#E5E4E2;" rowspan="2" | 
| The Song (Dziesma)
| 1908
|-
| 45 
| Northern Lights (Ziemeļblāzma)
| 1914
|-
| 14
| Récit for Viola or Cello and Piano
| style="background-color:#E5E4E2;" rowspan="7" | 
| 1894
|-
| 32
| 8 Latvian Folk Tunes for Piano
|  
|-
| 
| Symphony in E minor
| style="background-color:#E5E4E2;" rowspan="18" | 
| 1886–88
|-
| 37
| Sprīdītis
 Amethysts
 Emeralds
 Pearls
 Rubies
 Diamonds
| 1907
|-
| 42
| Fantasy on Latvian Folk Tunes
| 1908–10
|-
| 
| Autumn Song (Rudens dziesma)
| 1928
|-
| 28
| The Bard of Beverīna (Beverīnas dziedonis)
| 1891
|-
| —
| style="background-color:#E5E4E2;" rowspan="3" | 
| Sermon on the Mount (Kalna sprediķi)
| 1943
|-
| 12
| Sketch for Cello and Piano
|  
|-
| 8
| Berceuse
| 1892 
|-
| 39
| Rhapsody On Lithuanian Folksongs
| style="background-color:#E5E4E2;" |
| 
|-
| 29
| rowspan="4" style="background-color:#E5E4E2;" |
| 10 Chants Populaires Lettons
 Skaisti dziedi lakstīgala Rīgas torņa galiņā
 Apkārt kalnu gāju, kalniņa uzkapu,? Redzēj' savu sirdspuķīti gauži raudādam!
 Āvu, āvu baltas kājas, Lecu dārziņā
 Aijā, žūžu, lāča bērnis Plakanāmi kājiņāmi 
 Trīcēt trīcēj' visa Rīga Kas to Rīgu trīcināj'?
 Pūt vējiņi, dzen laiviņu, Aizdzen mani Kurzemē
 Redz kur jāja div' bajāri, Zīda pušķi zemi slauka
 Pati māte savu dēlu Kara vīru audzināja
 Kas to līgo ielīgoja? ligo! Mūsu pašu ciema ļaudis, līgo!
 Irbit gulēj' ceļmalāi, Baida manu kumeliņ'!
| 1901
|-
| 6
| Variations sur un Theme Lette
| 1892
|-
| 7
| Six Mélodies 
 Chant du Mendiant: „Faites l’aumône, bonnesgens“.
 Berceuse: „O souris grise, apporte le sommeil“.
 Chant du Ruisseau: „J’ai quitté les monts“.
 „Je ne puis rire“.
 Chant de Pêcheurs: „Mère Dvina, mère chère“.
 Je t’aime: „Je me rappelle ton premier sourire“. 
| 1892 
|-
| 3
| rowspan="2" style="background-color:#E5E4E2;" |
| Humoresque
| 1890 
|-
| 4
| La fête Lihgo 
| rowspan="3" style="background-color:#E5E4E2;" |
| 1889
|-
| 5
| style="background-color:#E5E4E2;" |
| 3 Songs (Dziesmas) 
 Das Blatt im Buche: "Ich hab’ eine alte Muhme"
 Schlimme Ahnung: "Flüchtig ist dein Kuss, Geliebte"
 Zu spät: "Sie haben dich fortgetragen" 
| 1892
|-
| 2
| Mélodie et Mazurka 
| rowspan="2" style="background-color:#E5E4E2;" |
| 1889
|-
| 43
| rowspan="19" style="background-color:#E5E4E2;" |
| 3 Reminiscences
| 1914
|-
| 53
| 3 Songs (Dziesmas) 
 Die Welle ("Hell strahlt die Sonne")
 Nebeltage ("Nun die Welt trübe")
 Lächeln ("Lächle einmal noch") 
| rowspan="3" style="background-color:#E5E4E2;" | 
| 1919
|-
| 55
| Berceuse in A
| style="background-color:#E5E4E2;" |
| 1921
|-
| 11
| rowspan="2" style="background-color:#E5E4E2;" |
| 3 Mélodies for Voice and Piano
 Heimkehr: "Es wintert draussen mit aller Macht"
 Die Fenster waren gefroren
 Du schläfst da so ruhig und süss
| 
|- 
| 13
| rowspan="2" style="background-color:#E5E4E2;" |
| 3 Preludes 
| 1894
|-
| 15
| Romance
| rowspan="2" style="background-color:#E5E4E2;" |
| 1894
|-
| 50
| rowspan="6" style="background-color:#E5E4E2;" |
| 5 chansons d'ete (Vasaras dziesmas)
| 1918
|- 
| 16
| rowspan="2" style="background-color:#E5E4E2;" |
| 3 Preludes
| 1895
|-
| 2
| 4 Morceaux
| 1895
|-
| 58 
| 12 Chansons Enfantines
| style="background-color:#E5E4E2;" | 
| 1921
|-
| 63
| style="background-color:#E5E4E2;" | 
| Piano Sonatina in B minor
| 1927
|-
| 52  
| 3 Songs (Dziesmas)  
 Dünastrom, Schwarzauge 
 Wiegenlied fürs Herz ("Törichtes Herz")
 Frühlingstage ("Kein Klagelaut jemals erkling") 
| rowspan="2" style="background-color:#E5E4E2;" |  
| 1919
|-
| 66
| Dargakeni
 Amethysts (Lento)
 Emeralds (Allegro rustico)
 Pearls (Allegro)
 Rubies (Agitato)
 Diamonds (Allegro di molto)
| rowspan="2" style="background-color:#E5E4E2;" |
| 1924 
|-
| 68
| rowspan="11" style="background-color:#E5E4E2;" |
| 8 miniatures (Astonas miniaturas)
| 1928
|-
| —
| String Quartet No. 1
| rowspan="2" style="background-color:#E5E4E2;" | 
| 1885
|-
| —
| Esquisse  
| 1894
|-
| 10
| rowspan"2" style="background-color:#E5E4E2;" |  
| 3 Preludes
| 1893
|-
| 9
| Mazurka et Valse
| rowspan="5" style="background-color:#E5E4E2;" |
| 1892 
|-
| 34
| Songs
|  
|-
| 35
| Das Lied
| style="background-color:#E5E4E2;" | 
|  
|-
| 61
| rowspan="8" style="background-color:#E5E4E2;" | 
| 3 Songs (Dziesmas) 
| 1925
|-
| 59
| 3 Songs (Dziesmas) 
| 1923
|-
| 24
| style="background-color:#E5E4E2;" | 
| Valse-Caprice
| 1897
|-
| 
| Song of the Sun’s Radiance  
| rowspan="2" style="background-color:#E5E4E2;" |
| 1911
|-
| 
| There is Still a Silent Night in My Mind
| rowspan="6" style="background-color:#E5E4E2;" | 
| 1911
|-
| 23
| rowspan="4" style="background-color:#E5E4E2;" |
| 2 Morceaux 
| 1897
|-
| 25 
| 3 Morceaux
| 1897
|-
| 33 
| Deux miniatures (Divas miniaturas)   
| 1905
|-
| 
| Rhapsody for Violin and Orchestra
| rowspan="3" style="background-color:#E5E4E2;" |
| 1918
|-
| 57
| rowspan="26" style="background-color:#E5E4E2;" |
| Carmina
| 1927
|- 
| 38
| rowspan="43" style="background-color:#E5E4E2;" |
| 3 Silhouettes
| 1909
|-
| 41
| style="background-color:#E5E4E2;" |
| 2 Morceaux 
 —
 Au Clair de la Lune  
| 1910
|-
| 44
| 3 songs (Dziesmas) 
| rowspan="2" style="background-color:#E5E4E2;" |  
| 1910
|-
| 48 
| 5 preludes de Naurena Elzas
| 1914
|-
| 54 
| rowspan="6" style="background-color:#E5E4E2;" |
| Variations-portraits
| 1920
|-
| 17 
| 3 Morceaux
| 1895
|-
| 18 
| Berceuse et Étude
| 1895
|-
| 19  
| 2 Preludes
| 1895
|-
| 20   
| 4 Morceaux
| 1895
|-
| 22 
| rowspan="2" style="background-color:#E5E4E2;" |
| style="background-color:#E5E4E2;" |
|-
| 31  
| 7 Lieder (Dziesmas)  
 Mans kaps (Mein Grab)  
 Mirdzas Lied: "Mondenstrahlen weben" 
 "Im Sinn liegt mir die stille Nacht"
| 1903-21
|-
| 26 
| rowspan="3" style="background-color:#E5E4E2;" |
| 3 Études
| 1898
|-
| 36  
| rowspan-"2" style="background-color:#E5E4E2;" | 
| rowspan-"2" style="background-color:#E5E4E2;" | 
|-
| 30  
| 3 Preludes
| 1903
|-
| 40  
| 8 Songs (Dziesmas) 
| rowspan="25" style="background-color:#E5E4E2;" |
| 1909
|- 
| 46 
| rowspan-"2" style="background-color:#E5E4E2;" | 
| rowspan-"2" style="background-color:#E5E4E2;" | 
|-
| 47    
| style="background-color:#E5E4E2;" |
| style="background-color:#E5E4E2;" |
|-
| 49  
| 5 Latvian Folk Songs
| 1916
|-
| 51 
| 3 Songs (Dziesmas)  
| 1919
|-
| 56 
| 3 Lieder (Trīs dziesmas) 
 Rozes visskaistākās
 Laimītei
 Laimas sveiciens
| 1921
|-
| 60 
| Le Chagrin du Pueple (Tautas bedas) 
 —
 —
 —
| 1923
|-
| 62  
| 3 Songs (Dziesmas) 
| 1925
|-
| 64 
| rowspan="21" style="background-color:#E5E4E2;" |
| rowspan="3" style="background-color:#E5E4E2;" |
|-
| 65 
|-
| 67  
|-
| —
| Autumn Song (Rudens Dzisma)  
| 
|-
| —
| Symphony in E minor   
| 1886–87
|-
| —
| Symphony No.2  
| 1901
|-
| —
| Tom Thumb   
| 1908
|-
| —
| Song of a Fisherwoman  
| 1911
|-
| —
| Song of the Sun’s Radiance   
| 1911
|-
| —
| There is Still a Silent Night in My Mind 
| 1911
|-
| —
| Goblet on the Isle of the Dead  
| 1911
|-
| —
| Rhapsody for Violin and Orchestra 
| 1918
|-
| —
| From the Tree of Acknowledgement   
| 1924
|-
| —
| A Song of Autumn  
| 1928
|-
| —
| Latvian Country Serenade for orchestra  
| 1934
|-
| —
| Sermon on the Mount
| 1943
|-
| —
| Legend for string quartet  
| 1942
|-
| —
| rowspan="4" style="background-color:#E5E4E2;" |   
| Pastorale (Pastorāle) for Organ
| 1913
|-
| — 
| 29 mélodies de chorals d'après le livre de l'église évangélique luthérienne lettonne (29 korāļi meldiju grāmatā latvijas evaņģēliski – luterāņu draudzēm)
| 1924
|-
| —
| Liturgie (Liturģija)
| 1934
|-
| —
| Liturgie de Pâques (Lieldienu liturģija)
| 1935
|}

 Musicology works 
 Anatoly Konstantinovich Lyadov: life, works and the time (one of the essays published with the biography essay by Victor Valter and rememberes by Sergey Gorodetsky) (1916) 

Celebration and remembrance

Jāzeps Vītols music days in Gaujiena started soon after 1922, when he spent summers in Gaujiena "Anniņas" with his wife. Celebrating his birthday, different choirs from all over the country started coming to Gaujiena for July 26 to celebrate Vītols' birthday with music. In 2003, a summer camp for children from music schools was started around this celebration, creating an orchestra and a choir to celebrate music and have fun as well as practice their instruments.

Notes

References

Braun, Joachim and Klotiņš, Arnold. "Vītols, Jāzeps". Grove Music Online '' (subscription required). ed. L. Macy. Retrieved on March 8, 2007.

External links

Homepage of the Jāzeps Vītols Latvian Academy of Music
Homepage of Musica Baltica Ltd

Jāzeps Vītols digital collection

1863 births
1948 deaths
People from Valmiera
People from Kreis Wolmar
Latvian composers
Romantic composers
20th-century classical composers
Latvian conductors (music)
Male conductors (music)
Latvian classical pianists
Latvian music critics
Latvian classical musicians
Saint Petersburg Conservatory alumni
Male classical composers
Latvian World War II refugees
Male classical pianists
20th-century conductors (music)
20th-century Russian male musicians
19th-century male musicians
Academic staff of Jāzeps Vītols Latvian Academy of Music
Composers from the Russian Empire
Latvian emigrants to Germany
Burials at Forest Cemetery, Riga